is a passenger railway station located in the city of Himeji, Hyōgo Prefecture, Japan, operated by the West Japan Railway Company (JR West).

Lines

Station layout
The station consists of two opposed ground-level side platforms connected by an elevated station building. The station is staffed.

Platforms

Adjacent stations

|-
!colspan=5|JR West

History
Harima-Katsuhara Station was opened on 15 March 2008.

Passenger statistics
In fiscal 2019, the station was used by an average of 5507 passengers daily

Surrounding area
Hyogo Prefectural Himeji Minami High School

See also
List of railway stations in Japan

References

External links

 JR West Station Official Site

Railway stations in Himeji
Sanyō Main Line
Railway stations in Japan opened in 2008